Campiglossa compta is a species of tephritid or fruit flies in the genus Campiglossa of the family Tephritidae.

Distribution
The species is found in Kenya.

References

Tephritinae
Insects described in 1957
Diptera of Africa